Long Eddy is a hamlet in Sullivan and Delaware counties, New York, United States. Long Eddy has a hotel/bar with outdoor barbecue, a historical society, fire station, public free river landing on the Delaware River as well as a post office with ZIP code 12760.

References

Hamlets in Sullivan County, New York
Hamlets in New York (state)